RIMS may refer to:

Institutions
 Rajendra Institute of Medical Sciences, in Ranchi, Jharkhand, India
 Rajiv Gandhi Institute of Medical Sciences (disambiguation), various institutes in India
 Regional Institute of Medical Sciences, a medical college and hospital in Manipur, India
 Research Institute for Mathematical Sciences, attached to Kyoto University in Japan
 Rhein-Main International Montessori School, a private school in Friedrichsdorf, Germany
 Risk and Insurance Management Society, a nonprofit organization dedicated to advancing risk management
 Rourkela Institute of Management Studies, a business school in Rourkela, Orissa, India

Other uses
 Regional Input–Output Modeling System
 Resonance Isolation Mounting System, the original rim mount for kit drums

See also 
 Rim (disambiguation)